Super Pack 2 is a compilation album by hip hop group Fly Union. The album was released on February 28, 2013. The album compiles three EPs from Fly Union's Value Pack EP series (Value Pack 5, Value Pack 6 and Value Pack 7 (Zenith)). The album features guest appearances from artists Chip tha Ripper, and GLC.

Track listing

Notes
 "The Hard Way" contains a sample from "The Darkest Street" by Fitz and the Tantrums.
 "Conflicted" contains a sample from "The Magic of Your Love" by The Majestic Arrows.

References

External links
Super Pack 2 on iTunes
Super Pack 2 on Amazon

2013 compilation albums
Hip hop albums by American artists